Arthrochilus laevicallus is a species of flowering plant in the orchid family (Orchidaceae) and is endemic to Papua New Guinea. It is leafless but has up to seven green, insect-like flowers with dark reddish glands on its labellum.

Description
Arthrochilus laevicallus is a terrestrial, perennial, deciduous, sympodial herb with an underground tuber which produces daughter tubers on the end of root-like stolons. The petals and lateral sepals turn backwards against the ovary. Flowering occurs in January.

Taxonomy and naming
Arthrochilus laevicallus was first formally described in 2011 by Paul Ormerod from a specimen collected near Tarara on the Wassi Kussa River in the west of Papua New Guinea. The description was published in The Orchadian.

Distribution and habitat
This elbow orchid grows in wet flats in forest in New Guinea.

References 

laevicallus
Plants described in 2011
Orchids of Papua New Guinea